Neochoanostoma is a genus of trematodes in the family Opecoelidae.

Species
Neochoanostoma avidabira Bray & Cribb, 1989
Neochoanostoma bariadiva Bray & Cribb, 1989
Neochoanostoma crassum Machida, 2014

References

Opecoelidae
Plagiorchiida genera